Virgil Fludd (born January 28, 1958) is an American politician. He was a member of the Georgia House of Representatives from the 64th District from 2002 to 2017. He is a member of the Democratic party.

In 2010, Fludd ran for House minority leader, but lost to Stacey Abrams. He was elected caucus chairman over Brian Thomas in 2012. Fludd opted not to seek reelection in 2016.

References

African-American state legislators in Georgia (U.S. state)
Living people
Democratic Party members of the Georgia House of Representatives
1958 births
21st-century American politicians
21st-century African-American politicians
20th-century African-American people